The title of Freedom of the City
is an honorary title granted by a city or corporation. It is granted to individuals to recognise exceptional services, usually to the city, or occasionally to the nation.  Since the enactment of the Honorary Freedom of Boroughs Act 1885, councils of boroughs and cities in England and Wales have been permitted to resolve to admit "persons of distinction" to be honorary freemen. This list is based on that published by the City of Liverpool. The Honour can also be awarded to Military Units or other Uniformed Services. when done this s referred to as the "Freedom of Entry".

Notes

References

 Free
Liverpool-related lists
Liverpool